Long Tall Weekend is the seventh studio album by American alternative rock duo They Might Be Giants, released in 1999. It was released exclusively online through the digital music service eMusic. The album was the band's first since their departure from the major label Elektra. Long Tall Weekend was also the first full-length album released exclusively on the Internet by an established major label band. Although the album's primary release was digital, CDs of the album were issued promotionally. Following the success of the album's release through eMusic, TMBG went on to issue a digital series of rarities collections — TMBG Unlimited — through their website.

Song origins
Many of the songs that appear on Long Tall Weekend existed as demos and selections from the band's Dial-A-Song service. "Drinkin'" was originally written six years prior to the release of the album. "Maybe I Know" had been in TMBG setlists since the 1980s. Many songs were intended for release in different forms on later albums. "She Thinks She's Edith Head" and "Older" resurfaced on Mink Car in 2001. The next year, "Rat Patrol," "Token Back to Brooklyn," "Reprehensible," "Certain People I Could Name" and "They Got Lost" appeared on the rarities compilation album They Got Lost, and "The Edison Museum" appeared on No!. "The Edison Museum" was originally written and recorded in 1991 and featured on the Edisongs compilation that year. The recorded version appearing on Long Tall Weekend is largely the same as the Edisongs version, though the mixing varies.

Some songs, such as "They Got Lost" and "Lullabye To Nightmares" had also existed in different forms prior to the release of Long Tall Weekend. The former was a live track with a much faster tempo from the band's live compilation Severe Tire Damage.

"They Got Lost" and "Certain People I Could Name" were both originally slated for inclusion on Factory Showroom.

Reception

Following the digital release of Long Tall Weekend, They Might Be Giants became the most downloaded band of 1999. John Flansburgh speculates that the feat was based not only on the content of the album, but also on the band's early willingness to embrace digital formats, having been urged to do so by the Restless Records label.

The album received generally favorable reviews from critics.

Track listing

Personnel
They Might Be Giants
John Linnell – songwriting, vocals, keyboard, organ, accordion, bass saxophone, baritone saxophone, programming, banjo, bass, horn, clarinet, fiddle
John Flansburgh – songwriting, vocals, acoustic, electric, and baritone guitar, programming

Additional musicians
Brian Doherty – drums
Yuval Gabay – drums on "Token Back to Brooklyn"
Dan Hickey – drums
Nick Hill – vocal on "The Edison Museum"
Graham Maby – bass guitar
Dan Miller – additional guitars
Eric Schermerhorn – additional guitars
Jay Sherman-Godfrey – additional guitars, cello
Danny Weinkauf – bass guitar

Production
Patrick Dillett and They Might Be Giants – producers
Annette Berry – design
Michael Kupperman – illustration

References

External links
 Long Tall Weekend page at This Might Be A Wiki
 Long Tall Weekend page at eMusic, available for download with paid subscription

1999 albums
They Might Be Giants albums
Albums produced by Pat Dillett